Vlastislav is a municipality and village in Litoměřice District in the Ústí nad Labem Region of the Czech Republic. It has about 200 inhabitants.

Geography
It lies in the Central Bohemian Uplands.

History
The first written mention of Vlastislav is from 1184, but there was a gord already in the early Middle Ages. According to legend in Chronica Boemorum, the gord was founded by Duke Vlastislav.

Sights

Vlastislav is known for the ruins of the Skalka Castle. The first documented owner of the castle was Petr of Skalka in 1357–1360, but the castle may be older. The castle was devastated by the Swedish army during the Thirty Years' War in 1639 and was never restored. Only bergfried of the castle has survived to this day. After the war, a new Baroque castle was built next to the ruins. Today, various exhibitions and expositions are located in its interiors.

Notable people
Christoph Schönborn (born 1945), Austrian cardinal, Archbishop of Vienna

References

External links

Villages in Litoměřice District